Huishui is a county of south-central Guizhou province, China. It is under the administration of the Qiannan Buyei and Miao Autonomous Prefecture. 61% of its 476,900 population are minorities, including Bouyei, Miao, Hui, Zhuang, Sui, Bai, and Maonan. In 1372 it was the seat of the historic Chengfan commandery (程番府).

Within Guizhou it is noted for its orange cultivation.

The gecko species Hemiphyllodactylus huishuiensis was first discovered in, and named after Huishui. A locally distributed species of Gesneriaceae plants was only found in Huishui.

Administrative divisions 
Huizhou governs 8 towns and 3 subdistricts:

 Lianjiang subdistrict (涟江街道)
 Mengjiang subdistrict (濛江街道)
 Mingtian subdistrict (明田街道)
 Haohuahong town (好花红镇)
 Baijin town (摆金镇)
 Yashui town (雅水镇)
 Duanshan town (断杉镇)
 Lushan town (芦山镇)
 Wangyou town (王佑镇)
 Xiantang town (羡塘镇)
 Gangdu town (岗度镇)

Climate

Transport 

 G69 Yinchuan–Baise Expressway
 G7611 Duyun–Shangri-La Expressway

References

External links

County-level divisions of Guizhou
Qiannan Buyei and Miao Autonomous Prefecture